Wrestling is a 2008 romantic drama film directed by Jeremy O'Keefe and starring Jeff Conaway, Mark Welling, Lauren Schneider, Melissa Claire Egan, and Susan Moses. The screenplay concerns teenagers growing up in Wilmington, Delaware.

External links 
 Official film site
 

2008 films
2008 romantic drama films
American romantic drama films
Films set in Delaware
Wilmington, Delaware
2000s English-language films
2000s American films